Blandinia is a monotypic genus of spiders in the family Pisauridae. It was first described in 2016 by Tonini et al. as a replacement name for Ransonia. , it contains only one species, Blandinia mahasoana, from Madagascar.

References

Pisauridae
Monotypic Araneomorphae genera
Spiders of Madagascar